Fußballklub Flyeralarm Admira Wacker Mödling, also known as Flyeralarm Admira for sponsorship reasons or simply Admira, is a football club from Mödling, Austria. The club was originally formed in 1905 as SK Admira Wien in the Austrian capital. Mergers in 1971 with SC Wacker Wien, in 1997 with VfB Mödling and in 2008 with SK Schwadorf led to its current name.

The club were promoted to the Austrian Bundesliga for the 2011–12 season after gaining promotion at the end of the 2010–11 First League season and finished 3rd in their first season.

History

SK Admira Vienna
SK Admira Vienna was formed in the Vienna district of Jedlesee as a merger between two football clubs named Burschenschaft Einigkeit and Sportklub Vindobona in 1905. In 1919, Admira were promoted to the first tier of the Austrian league system for the first time in their history. The club soon became one of the more successful teams during the inter-war period, capturing seven Austrian national championship and three Austrian Cup titles. Several Admira players were also regulars in the Austria national football team at this time.

After the Anschluss in 1938, Admira played for several seasons in the Gauliga Ostmark, one of the top-flight regional leagues created through the reorganization of German football under the Third Reich. Their win of the 1938–39 Gauliga Ostmark qualified them for the 1939 German football championship, in which Admira made their way to the final against Schalke 04, which was the dominant German football team of the era. They lost overwhelmingly by a score of 0–9. This effort marked the last major success for Vienna before the end of World War II.

Post-War
The post-war period led to a slow, but steady decline due to lack of funds to buy more competitive players. It eventually culminated into the first brief relegation from the top tier after forty years in 1960. The club underwent two name changes in that period, playing as ESV Admira Vienna after a merger with the railroad sports club ESV Vienna in 1953 before changing to ESV Admira-NÖ Energie Vienna in 1960 due to a sponsorship agreement with regional energy suppliers NEWAG/NIOGAS. Soon thereafter, Admira (or Admira Energie, as it was called in most media during the time) regained some of its earlier strength, winning the Austrian Cup in 1964 and the Double of league and cup titles in 1966.

The revelation of financial scandals within NEWAG/NIOGAS in the late 1960s led to an abrupt end of the steady flow of funds and brought the club onto the brink of administration, which would narrowly be avoided. Nevertheless, Admira began looking for a merger partner, and particularly targeted Austria Vienna. However, after the creation of Admira-Austria was declined twice, Admira eventually began talks with SC Wacker Vienna, which were successfully concluded in 1971.

SC Wacker Vienna
Wacker Vienna was formed in 1908 in the Vienna district of Meidling. The club reached the first tier of the Austrian league system for the first time in 1914. Being a mid-table side until the second half of the 1930s, Wacker became a top-team in the 1940s and 1950s, winning the double in 1947 and ending as league runners-up eight more times between 1940 and 1956.

During the last decade as an independent club it became a bona-fide yo-yo club, with eight straight relegations from or promotions to the Austrian top tier between 1961 and 1968. A fifth relegation in 1971, combined with financial and stadium problems, eventually led to a merger with Admira, forming FC Admira/Wacker Vienna.

VfB Mödling

VfB Mödling was formed on 17 June 1911 in the Lower Austrian town of Mödling. Since their foundation, Mödling were playing in the highest Lower Austrian league. With the introduction of an Austria-wide national league in 1949, the club was classified into the second tier. Playing most of its existence in second- and third-tier leagues since then, the club enjoyed three brief stints in the top division during the 1952–53 and 1987–88 seasons as well as between 1992 and 1995 before eventually merging with Admira/Wacker in 1997.

In 1997, after a financial crisis, VfB Mödling and Admira Wacker merged. In 2004 Iranian Majid Pishyar purchased the club. His stewardship of the club led to on-field and off-field difficulties. The club was relegated after the 2005–06 season. With further financial trouble, Pishyar sold the club to Richard Trenkwalder in 2008. Trenkwalder made a series of changes to the club, including changing the club's name to FC Trenkwalder Admira. His changes eventually paid off, with the club gaining promotion back to the Austrian first division following the 2010–11 season. (Majid Pishyar, meanwhile, notably also caused similar financial problems at a Swiss club, Servette, in the 2011–12 season.)

In 2017, Würzburg-based online printing company Flyeralarm acquired the naming rights for the club, meaning the club will be known as "Flyeralarm Admira" for ten years.

Honours
Austrian Champions: 9
Admira Vienna (8): 1926–27, 1927–28, 1931–32, 1933–34, 1935–36, 1936–37, 1938–39, 1965–66
Wacker Vienna: 1946–47

Austrian Cup: 6
Admira Vienna (5): 1927–28, 1931–32, 1933–34, 1963–64, 1965–66
Wacker Vienna: 1946–47

Austrian Supercup: 1
Admira / Wacker Vienna: 1989

Mitropa Cup Finalist: 2
Admira Vienna (1): 1934
Wacker Vienna (1): 1951

European tournaments history

Notes

Players

Current squad

Out on loan

Former players

  Peter Wurz
  Nicolae Lupescu
  Marcel Sabitzer

Coaches

 Hans Pesser (1 July 1960 – 30 June 1967)
 Karl Schlechta (1971)
 Ernst Ocwirk (1 July 1971 – 30 June 1973)
 Rudolf Matuschka (18 May 1975 – 30 June 1975)
 Helmut Senekowitsch (1 July 1975 – 14 May 1976)
 Rudolf Matuschka (16 May 1976 – 30 June 1976)
 Franz Pelikan (1976)
 Rudolf Matuschka (Jan 1977 – June 1977)
 Stefan Jasiolek /  Franz Pelikan (July 1977 – Dec 77)
 Antoni Brzeżańczyk (1978)
 Rudolf Illovszky (1 July 1978 – 19 May 1979)
 Felix Latzke (23 May 1979 – 30 April 1983)
 Ernst Dokupil (5 May 1983 – 16 August 1986)
 August Starek (1 July 1986 – 13 March 1988)
 Wilhelm Kreuz (14 March 1988 – 30 June 1988)
 Ernst Weber (1 July 1988 – 30 June 1990)
 Thomas Parits (1 July 1990 – 11 May 1991)
 Sigfried Held (11 May 1991 – 30 June 1993)
 Dietmar Constantini (1 July 1993 – 31 May 1995)
 Walter Knaller (1 July 1995 – 30 June 1996)
 Kurt Garger (1 July 1996 – 30 June 1997)
 Wolfgang Kienast (1 July 1997 – 30 August 1997)
 Milan Miklavič (1 September 1997 – 30 June 1998)
 Hannes Weninger (1 July 1998 – 22 April 1999)
 Ilija Sormaz (interim) (24 April 1999 – 26 April 1999)
 Milan Miklavič (26 April 1999 – 26 August 2000)
 Hans Krankl (6 September 2000 – 31 December 2001)
 Walter Knaller (1 January 2002 – 22 October 2002)
 Johann Krejcirik (interim) (25 October 2002 – 9 December 2002)
 Alfred Tatar (10 December 2002 – 11 May 2003)
 Rashid Rakhimov (10 December 2002 – 11 May 2004)
  Bernd Krauss (11 May 2004 – 22 September 2004)
 Dominik Thalhammer (23 September 2004 – 16 August 2005)
 Robert Pflug (17 August 2005 – 16 February 2006)
 Ernst Baumeister (16 February 2006 – 23 December 2007)
 Attila Sekerlioglu (23 December 2007 – 18 April 2008)
 Ernst Baumeister (2008)
 Heinz Peischl (1 July 2008 – 8 August 2008)
 Walter Schachner (9 August 2008 – 26 April 2010)
 Dietmar Kühbauer (26 April 2010 – 11 June 2013)
 Toni Polster (17 June 2013 – 10 August 2013)
 Oliver Lederer (10 August 2013 – 19 September 2013)
 Walter Knaller (19 September 2013 – 6 April 2015)
 Oliver Lederer (6 April 2015 – 30 June 2015)
 Ernst Baumeister (1 July 2015 – 30 June 2016)
 Oliver Lederer (1 July 2016 – 3 January 2017)
 Damir Burić (3 January 2017 – 9 September 2017)
 Ernst Baumeister (9 September 2017 –  28 October 2018)
 Reiner Geyer (29 October 2018 – 2 September 2019)
 Klaus Schmidt (2 September 2019 – 23 February 2020)
 Zvonimir Soldo (25 February 2020 – 13 September 2020)
 Patrick Helmes (interim) (13 September 2020 – 22 September 2020)
 Damir Burić (22 September 2020 – 26 April 2021)
 Klaus Schmidt (26 April 2021 – 30 June 2021)
 Andi Herzog (1 July 2021 – Present)

References

External links

  

 
Football clubs in Vienna
Football clubs in Austria
Association football clubs established in 1905
Football clubs from former German territories
1905 establishments in Austria
Mödling
Sport in Lower Austria